Liškovac (Serbian Cyrillic: Лишковац) is a mountain in eastern Serbia, between towns of Majdanpek and Donji Milanovac. Its highest peak Veliki Liškovac has an elevation of 803 meters above sea level. Along with Miroč, Liškovac is part of the Iron Gate of the Danube river. It is located in the Đerdap national park.

References

Mountains of Serbia
Serbian Carpathians